Hura crepitans, the sandbox tree, also known as possumwood, monkey no-climb, assacu and jabillo, is an evergreen tree in the family Euphorbiaceae, native to tropical regions of North and South America including the Amazon rainforest. It is also present in parts of Tanzania, where it is considered an invasive species. Because its fruit explodes when ripe, it has also received the colloquial nickname the dynamite tree.

Description
They are monoecious, with red, un-petaled flowers. Male flowers grow on long spikes, while female flowers grow alone in leaf axils. The trunk is covered in long, sharp spikes that secrete poisonous sap. Its seeds are flattened and about  diameter.

Habitat
This tree prefers wet soil, and partial shade or partial to full sun. It is often cultivated for shade. Sandbox trees are tropical trees and prefer warmer, more humid environments.

Uses
Fishermen have been said to use the milky, caustic sap from this tree to poison fish. The Caribs made arrow poison from its sap.
The wood is used for furniture under the name "hura". Before more modern forms of pens were invented, the trees' unripe seed capsules were sawn in half to make decorative pen sandboxes (also called pounce pots), hence the name 'sandbox tree'. It has been documented as a herbal remedy, and is available online.

Gallery

References

External links

 Center for Wood Anatomy Research, details about the wood of the Sandbox tree
 University of São Paulo: Hura crepitans photos
 www.maya-ethnobotany.org seedpod explosion video

Ayahuasca
Euphorbioideae
Flora of South America
Medicinal plants of Central America
Medicinal plants of North America
Medicinal plants of South America
Plants described in 1753
Taxa named by Carl Linnaeus
Poisonous plants